This article attempts to list the oldest buildings in the city of Sofia, Bulgaria, including the oldest temples and any other surviving structures. In most instances, buildings listed here were reconstructed numerous times and only fragments of the original buildings have survived. Some dates are approximate and based on architectural studies and historical records.
In order to qualify for the list a structure must:
 be a recognisable building (defined as any human-made structure used or intended for supporting or sheltering any use or continuous occupancy);
incorporate features of building work from the claimed date to at least  in height.

This consciously excludes ruins of limited height, roads and statues.

Other structures 
The following are old constructions, mostly ruins that might not fit the above criteria for a building.

See also 

List of oldest church buildings
List of churches in Sofia
Ancient Roman architecture
Byzantine architecture
History of Sofia
Timeline of Sofia history
List of oldest buildings in Varna

References

 oldest
Sofia